The 2022–23 Dallas Mavericks season is the 43rd season of the franchise in the National Basketball Association (NBA).

Draft

The Mavericks traded away their second-round pick in 2022.

Roster

Standings

Division

Conference

Game log

Pre-season
The schedule was announced on August 25, 2022.

|-style="background:#cfc;"
| 1
| October 5
| @ Oklahoma City
| 
| Jaden Hardy (21)
| Christian Wood (13)
| McKinley Wright IV (10)
| BOK Center
| 1–0
|-style="background:#fcc;"
| 2
| October 7
| Orlando
| 
| Christian Wood (23)
| Tyler Dorsey (5)
| Luka Dončić (5)
| American Airlines Center19,360
| 1–1
|-style="background:#cfc;"
| 3
| October 14
| @ Utah
| 
| Luka Dončić (24)
| Christian Wood (10)
| Spencer Dinwiddie (9)
| Vivint Arena15,713
| 2–1

Regular season
The schedule was announced on August 17, 2022.

|- style="background:#fcc;"
| 1
| October 19
| @ Phoenix
| 
| Luka Dončić (35)
| Luka Dončić (9)
| Luka Dončić (6)
| Footprint Center17,071
| 0–1
|- style="background:#cfc;"
| 2
| October 22
| Memphis
| 
| Luka Dončić (32)
| Christian Wood (12)
| Luka Dončić (10)
| American Airlines Center20,377
| 1–1
|- style="background:#fcc;"
| 3
| October 25
| @ New Orleans
| 
| Luka Dončić (37)
| Luka Dončić (11)
| Luka Dončić (7)
| Smoothie King Center14,020
| 1–2
|- style="background:#cfc;"
| 4
| October 27
| @ Brooklyn
| 
| Luka Dončić (41)
| Luka Dončić (11)
| Luka Dončić (14)
| Barclays Center18,039
| 2–2
|-style="background:#fcc;"
| 5
| October 29
| Oklahoma City
| 
| Luka Dončić (31)
| Luka Dončić (16)
| Luka Dončić (10)
| American Airlines Center20,307
| 2–3
|-style="background:#cfc;"
| 6
| October 30
| Orlando
| 
| Luka Dončić (44)
| Christian Wood (10)
| Dinwiddie, Dončić (5)
| American Airlines Center20,042
| 3–3

|-style="background:#cfc;"
| 7
| November 2
| Utah
| 
| Luka Dončić (33)
| Christian Wood (10)
| Luka Dončić (11)
| American Airlines Center19,877
| 4–3
|-style="background:#cfc;"
| 8
| November 4
| Toronto
| 
| Luka Dončić (35)
| Luka Dončić (8)
| Spencer Dinwiddie (7)
| American Airlines Center20,177
| 5–3
|-style="background:#cfc;"
| 9
| November 7
| Brooklyn
| 
| Luka Dončić (36)
| Dwight Powell (8)
| Luka Dončić (6)
| American Airlines Center20,011
| 6–3
|-style="background:#fcc;"
| 10
| November 9
| @ Orlando
| 
| Spencer Dinwiddie (29)
| Dončić, McGee (6)
| Luka Dončić (6)
| Amway Center18,165
| 6–4
|-style="background:#fcc;"
| 11
| November 10
| @ Washington
| 
| Spencer Dinwiddie (33)
| Luka Dončić (9)
| Dinwiddie, Dončić (6)
| Capital One Arena18,320
| 6–5
|-style="background:#cfc;"
| 12
| November 12
| Portland
| 
| Luka Dončić (42)
| Luka Dončić (13)
| Luka Dončić (10)
| American Airlines Center20,277
| 7–5
|-style="background:#cfc;"
| 13
| November 15
| L.A. Clippers
| 
| Luka Dončić (35)
| Luka Dončić (11)
| Spencer Dinwiddie (6)
| American Airlines Center19,810
| 8–5
|-style="background:#fcc;"
| 14
| November 16
| Houston
| 
| Tim Hardaway Jr. (28)
| Finney-Smith, Wood (8)
| Spencer Dinwiddie (10)
| American Airlines Center19,602
| 8–6
|-style="background:#cfc;"
| 15
| November 18
| Denver
| 
| Luka Dončić (33)
| Luka Dončić (12)
| Luka Dončić (11)
| American Airlines Center20,135
| 9–6
|-style="background:#fcc;"
| 16
| November 20
| Denver
| 
| Josh Green (23)
| Luka Dončić (9)
| Dinwiddie, Dončić (8)
| American Airlines Center20,244
| 9–7
|-style="background:#fcc;"
| 17
| November 23
| @ Boston
| 
| Luka Dončić (42)
| Christian Wood (12)
| Luka Dončić (9)
| TD Garden19,156
| 9–8
|-style="background:#fcc;"
| 18
| November 26
| @ Toronto
| 
| Luka Dončić (24)
| Luka Dončić (7)
| Luka Dončić (9)
| Scotiabank Arena19,800
| 9–9
|-style="background:#fcc;"
| 19
| November 27
| @ Milwaukee
| 
| Luka Dončić (27)
| Christian Wood (7)
| Luka Dončić (12)
| Fiserv Forum17,341
| 9–10
|-style="background:#cfc;"
| 20
| November 29
| Golden State
| 
| Luka Dončić (41)
| Luka Dončić (12)
| Luka Dončić (12)
| American Airlines Center20,277
| 10–10

|-style="background:#fcc;"
| 21
| December 1
| @ Detroit
| 
| Luka Dončić (35)
| Christian Wood (8)
| Luka Dončić (10)
| Little Caesars Arena18,106
| 10–11
|-style="background:#cfc;"
| 22
| December 3
| @ New York
| 
| Luka Dončić (30)
| Spencer Dinwiddie (9)
| Spencer Dinwiddie (9)
| Madison Square Garden18,319
| 11–11
|-style="background:#cfc;"
| 23
| December 5
| Phoenix
| 
| Luka Dončić (33)
| Christian Wood (9)
| Luka Dončić (8)
| American Airlines Center20,227
| 12–11
|-style="background:#cfc;"
| 24
| December 6
| @ Denver
| 
| Tim Hardaway Jr. (29)
| Luka Dončić (10)
| Luka Dončić (12) 
| Ball Arena19,520
| 13–11
|-style="background:#fcc;"
| 25
| December 9
| Milwaukee
| 
| Luka Dončić (33)
| Christian Wood (9)
| Luka Dončić (11)
| American Airlines Center20,277
| 13–12
|-style="background:#fcc;"
| 26
| December 10
| @ Chicago
| 
| Spencer Dinwiddie (27)
| Christian Wood (9)
| Spencer Dinwiddie (8)
| United Center19,528
| 13–13
|-style="background:#cfc;"
| 27
| December 12
| Oklahoma City
| 
| Luka Dončić (38)
| Luka Dončić (11)
| Spencer Dinwiddie (10)
| American Airlines Center19,877
| 14–13
|-style="background:#fcc;"
| 28
| December 14
| Cleveland
| 
| Luka Dončić (30)
| Christian Wood (7)
| Spencer Dinwiddie (7)
| American Airlines Center20,093
| 14–14
|-style="background:#cfc;"
| 29
| December 16
| Portland
| 
| Luka Dončić (33)
| Christian Wood (12)
| Luka Dončić (9)
| American Airlines Center20,191
| 15–14
|-style="background:#fcc;"
| 30
| December 17
| @ Cleveland
| 
| Kemba Walker (32)
| Christian Wood (14)
| Kemba Walker (7)
| Rocket Mortgage FieldHouse19,432
| 15–15
|-style="background:#fcc;"
| 31
| December 19
| @ Minnesota
| 
| Spencer Dinwiddie (20)
| Christian Wood (13)
| Dinwiddie, Dončić (7)
| Target Center16,627
| 15–16
|-style="background:#cfc;"
| 32
| December 21
| @ Minnesota
| 
| Luka Dončić (25)
| Luka Dončić (9)
| Luka Dončić (10)
| Target Center16,164
| 16–16
|-style="background:#cfc;"
| 33
| December 23
| @ Houston
| 
| Luka Dončić (50)
| Luka Dončić (8)
| Luka Dončić (10)
| Toyota Center16,989
| 17–16
|-style="background:#cfc;"
| 34
| December 25
| L.A. Lakers
| 
| Luka Dončić (32)
| Luka Dončić (9)
| Luka Dončić (9)
| American Airlines Center20,441
| 18–16
|-style="background:#cfc;"
| 35
| December 27
| New York
| 
| Luka Dončić (60)
| Luka Dončić (21)
| Luka Dončić (10)
| American Airlines Center20,377
| 19–16
|-style="background:#cfc;"
| 36
| December 29
| Houston
| 
| Luka Dončić (35)
| Luka Dončić (12)
| Luka Dončić (13)
| American Airlines Center20,307
| 20–16
|-style="background:#cfc;"
| 37
| December 31
| @ San Antonio
| 
| Luka Dončić (51)
| Christian Wood (7)
| Luka Dončić (9)
| AT&T Center18,354
| 21–16

|-style="background:#cfc;"
| 38
| January 2
| @ Houston
| 
| Luka Dončić (39)
| Luka Dončić (12)
| Luka Dončić (8)
| Toyota Center18,055
| 22–16
|-style="background:#fcc;"
| 39
| January 5
| Boston
| 
| Luka Dončić (23)
| Christian Wood (12)
| Spencer Dinwiddie (5)
| American Airlines Center20,413
| 22–17
|-style="background:#cfc;"
| 40
| January 7
| New Orleans
| 
| Luka Dončić (34)
| Luka Dončić (10)
| Luka Dončić (10)
| American Airlines Center20,300
| 23–17
|-style="background:#fcc;"
| 41
| January 8
| @ Oklahoma City
| 
| Christian Wood (27)
| Christian Wood (16)
| Spencer Dinwiddie (8)
| Paycom Center16,317
| 23–18
|-style="background:#fcc;"
| 42
| January 10
| @ LA Clippers
| 
| Luka Dončić (43)
| Luka Dončić (11)
| Luka Dončić (7)
| Crypto.com Arena15,828
| 23–19
|-style="background:#cfc;"
| 43
| January 12
| @ L.A. Lakers
| 
| Luka Dončić (35)
| Dončić, Wood (14)
| Luka Dončić (13)
| Crypto.com Arena18,997
| 24–19
|-style="background:#fcc;"
| 44
| January 14
| @ Portland
| 
| Spencer Dinwiddie (25)
| Luka Dončić (6)
| Luka Dončić (10)
| Moda Center19,393
| 24–20
|-style="background:#fcc;"
| 45
| January 15
| @ Portland
| 
| Spencer Dinwiddie (28)
| Christian Wood (16)
| Spencer Dinwiddie (9)
| Moda Center19,393
| 24–21
|-style="background:#fcc;"
| 46
| January 18
| Atlanta
| 
| Luka Dončić (30)
| Finney-Smith, Wood (9)
| Luka Dončić (8)
| American Airlines Center20,125
| 24–22
|-style="background:#cfc;"
| 47
| January 20
| Miami
| 
| Luka Dončić (34)
| Luka Dončić (12)
| Luka Dončić (7)
| American Airlines Center20,326
| 25–22
|-style="background:#fcc;"
| 48
| January 22
| L.A. Clippers
| 
| Luka Dončić (29)
| Luka Dončić (10)
| Spencer Dinwiddie (5)
| American Airlines Center20,026
| 25–23
|-style="background:#fcc;"
| 49
| January 24
| Washington
| 
| Luka Dončić (41)
| Luka Dončić (15)
| Spencer Dinwiddie (8)
| American Airlines Center20,077
| 25–24
|-style="background:#cfc;"
| 50
| January 26
| @ Phoenix
| 
| Spencer Dinwiddie (36)
| Dorian Finney-Smith (12)
| Spencer Dinwiddie (9)
| Footprint Center17,071
| 26–24
|-style="background:#fcc;"
| 51
| January 28
| @ Utah
| 
| Spencer Dinwiddie (35)
| Dorian Finney-Smith (9)
| Spencer Dinwiddie (8)
| Vivint Arena18,206
| 26–25
|-style="background:#cfc;"
| 52
| January 30
| Detroit
| 
| Luka Dončić (53)
| Dončić, Powell (8)
| Luka Dončić (5)
| American Airlines Center19,777
| 27–25

|-style="background:#cfc;"
| 53
| February 2
| New Orleans
| 
| Luka Dončić (31)
| Luka Dončić (8)
| three players (4)
| American Airlines Center19,670
| 28–25
|-style="background:#fcc;"
| 54
| February 4
| @ Golden State
| 
| Spencer Dinwiddie (25)
| Dorian Finney-Smith (9)
| McKinley Wright IV (5)
| Chase Center18,064
| 28–26
|-style="background:#cfc;"
| 55
| February 6
| @ Utah
| 
| Green, Hardy (29)
| Dwight Powell (16)
| three players (4)
| Vivint Arena18,206
| 29–26
|-style="background:#cfc;"
| 56
| February 8
| @ L.A. Clippers
| 
| Kyrie Irving (24)
| Powell, Wood (6)
| Bullock, Hardaway Jr. (6)
| Crypto.com Arena18,337
| 30–26
|-style="background:#cfc;"
| 57
| February 10
| @ Sacramento
| 
| Kyrie Irving (25)
| JaVale McGee (9)
| Kyrie Irving (10)
| Golden 1 Center18,111
| 31–26
|-style="background:#fcc;"
| 58
| February 11
| @ Sacramento
| 
| Kyrie Irving (28)
| Luka Dončić (9)
| Kyrie Irving (7)
| Golden 1 Center18,111
| 31–27
|-style="background:#fcc;"
| 59
| February 13
| Minnesota
| 
| Kyrie Irving (36)
| Luka Dončić (12)
| Dončić, Irving (6)
| American Airlines Center20,325
| 31–28
|-style="background:#fcc;"
| 60
| February 15
| @ Denver
| 
| Luka Dončić (37)
| Dwight Powell (10)
| Luka Dončić (9)
| Ball Arena19,627
| 31–29
|-style="background:#cfc;"
| 61
| February 23
| San Antonio
| 
| Luka Dončić (28)
| Dwight Powell (8)
| Luka Dončić (10)
| American Airlines Center20,287
| 32–29
|-style="background:#fcc;"
| 62
| February 26
| L.A. Lakers
| 
| Luka Dončić (26)
| Kyrie Irving (11)
| Dončić, Irving (5)
| American Airlines Center20,411
| 32–30
|-style="background:#fcc;"
| 63
| February 28
| Indiana
| 
| Luka Dončić (39)
| Luka Dončić (8)
| Kyrie Irving (9)
| American Airlines Center20,277
| 32–31

|-style="background:#cfc;"
| 64
| March 2
| Philadelphia
| 
| Luka Dončić (42)
| Maxi Kleber (6)
| Luka Dončić (12)
| American Airlines Center20,002
| 33–31
|-style="background:#fcc;"
| 65
| March 5
| Phoenix
| 
| Luka Dončić (34)
| Luka Dončić (9)
| Kyrie Irving (7)
| American Airlines Center20,311
| 33–32
|-style="background:#cfc;"
| 66
| March 7
| Utah
| 
| Kyrie Irving (33)
| Luka Dončić (10)
| Kyrie Irving (8)
| American Airlines Center  20,277
| 34–32
|-style="background:#fcc;"
| 67
| March 8
| @ New Orleans
| 
| Kyrie Irving (27)
| Christian Wood (8)
| Luka Dončić (8)
| Smoothie King Center 17,473 
| 34–33
|-style="background:#fcc;"
| 68
| March 11
| @ Memphis
| 
| Tim Hardaway Jr. (23)
| Josh Green (10)
| McKinley Wright IV (5)
| FedExForum17,794
| 34–34
|-style="background:#fcc;"
| 69
| March 13
| Memphis
| 
| Jaden Hardy (28)
| Jaden Hardy (8)
| Josh Green (7)
| American Airlines Center 20,303
| 34–35
|-style="background:#cfc;"
| 70
| March 15
| @ San Antonio
| 
| Christian Wood (28)
| Bullock, Wood (13)
| Josh Green  (7)
| AT&T Center18,354
| 35–35
|-style="background:#cfc;"
| 71
| March 17
| @ L.A. Lakers
| 
| Kyrie Irving (38)
| Christian Wood (9)
|  Christian Wood (8)
| Crypto.com Arena  18,997
| 36–35
|-
| 72
| March 20
| @ Memphis
| 
| 
| 
| 
| FedExForum
| 
|-
| 73
| March 22
| Golden State
| 
| 
| 
| 
| American Airlines Center
| 
|-
| 74
| March 24
| Charlotte
| 
| 
| 
| 
| American Airlines Center
| 
|-
| 75
| March 26
| @ Charlotte
| 
| 
| 
| 
| Spectrum Center
| 
|-
| 76
| March 27
| @ Indiana
| 
| 
| 
| 
| Gainbridge Fieldhouse
| 
|-
| 77
| March 29
| @ Philadelphia
| 
| 
| 
| 
| Wells Fargo Center
| 

|-
| 78
| April 1
| @ Miami
| 
| 
| 
| 
| FTX Arena
| 
|-
| 79
| April 2
| @ Atlanta
| 
| 
| 
| 
| State Farm Arena
| 
|-
| 80
| April 5
| Sacramento
| 
| 
| 
| 
| American Airlines Center
| 
|-
| 81
| April 7
| Chicago
| 
| 
| 
| 
| American Airlines Center
| 
|-
| 82
| April 9
| San Antonio
| 
| 
| 
| 
| American Airlines Center
|

Transactions

Trades

Contract extensions

Additions

Subtractions

Awards

References

Dallas Mavericks seasons
Dallas Mavericks
Dallas Mavericks
Dallas Mavericks